Temir (- Temirovka) is a village in the Issyk-Kul Region of Kyrgyzstan. It is part of the Issyk-Kul District. Its population was 4,849 in 2021. Temir / Темир means "iron" in Kyrgyz.

References

Populated places in Issyk-Kul Region